The Kootenai Formation is a Lower Cretaceous geologic formation. The Kootenai was deposited in a foreland basin east of the Sevier thrust belt in western Montana. The lithology consists of a basal conglomerate with overlying non-marine sandstones, shales and lacustrine limestones.

Dinosaur remains are among the fossils that have been recovered from the formation, although none have yet been referred to a specific genus.

See also 
 List of dinosaur-bearing rock formations
 List of stratigraphic units with indeterminate dinosaur fossils

References

Bibliography 
  

Cretaceous Montana
Lower Cretaceous Series of North America
Aptian Stage